Oʻrtachirchiq is a district of Tashkent Region in Uzbekistan. The capital lies at the city Nurafshon, itself not part of the district. The district consists of 4 urban-type settlements (Tuyaboʻgʻiz, Kuchluk, Qorasuv, Sholikor) and 13 rural communities (Angor, Qumovul, Qorasuv, Oq ota, Haqiqat, Navoiy nomli, Yoʻngʻichqala, Paxtaobod, Paxtakor, Oʻrtasaroy, Istiqbol, Yangi turmush, Uyshun).

References

Districts of Uzbekistan
Tashkent Region